Brunthwaite is a hamlet in Cumbria, England. Medieval pottery has been unearthed in the area.

References

Hamlets in Cumbria
South Lakeland District